Andreas Gustaf Grönberger (Stockholm Sweden, 12 June 1882 – Stockholm, 29 August 1972) was an athlete who won bronze medal at the 1906 Intercalated Games in tug of war.

He competed at the Tug war at the Games. There was direct elimination during the game. At first round Greece defeated Sweden, who later won at the round for the bronze medal against Austria

Sources
Data
Data

1882 births
1972 deaths
Sportspeople from Stockholm
Tug of war competitors at the 1906 Intercalated Games
Gymnasts at the 1906 Intercalated Games
Medalists at the 1906 Intercalated Games